Oliver Madox Hueffer (born Oliver Franz Hueffer; 1877 – 22 June 1931), was an author, playwright, and war correspondent.

Biography
Heuffer was born in 1877 in Surrey to Catherine Madox Brown, an artist, and Francis Hueffer, a German-English writer on music, music critic and librettist. His brother was the writer Ford Madox Ford (born Ford Madox Heuffer), and his sister was the English translator and writer Juliet Soskice (née Hueffer). The Pre-Raphaelite painter Ford Madox Brown was his maternal grandfather. 

Hueffner graduated from the University College School, in London, then pursued university  studies at several European institutions.

While in search of employment on his first visit to New York City, he wrote a column, "A Vagabond in New York", published in Truth. These collected writings resulted in his 1913 book by the same title, published by the John Lane Company. In it, he colourfully recounted his penurious and picaresque existence living in the public spaces of an unfamiliar city, finding, due to his "provincial" accent and English phraseology, no immediate career in writing and only dead-end jobs, including bartender, delicatessen assistant and sideshow "fakir". He aspired to become a passable speaker of "the President's English" within a year or two. He recounted that his return trip to England saw him travelling in steerage, stoking coal on the steamer which carried him home.

While covering the Mexican Revolution for the Daily Express, he was reported in 1910 to have been "executed and buried" for spying on behalf of the Americans, having been court-martialed and sentenced to death; British intervention saw him safely out of the country. During the First World War, fought for the British 

For ten years, he was the music critic for The Times.

In all, he resided in five major cities: London, Paris, Berlin, Rome and New York City, providing him with much of the source material for his books and plays.

Books 
Six of his novels were written under the pseudonym of "Jane Wardle".
 French France (1929) cultural commentary
 Some of the English (1930) cultural commentary
 Monographs on Various Eighteenth-Century Painters
 The Artistic Temperament novel
 Marjorie Pigeon
 The Pasque Flower

Plays 
 The Lord of Latimer Street (1907)
 Fine Feathers
 The Pilgrim
 A Scarecrow Emperor
 Down Stream

He died on 22 June 1931.

Works 

 The Book of Witches, New York, 1909.

References

1877 births
1931 deaths
British war correspondents
English dramatists and playwrights
English people of German descent
English male dramatists and playwrights